Woyzeck is a 1994 Hungarian drama film directed by János Szász. The film was selected as the Hungarian entry for the Best Foreign Language Film at the 67th Academy Awards, but was not accepted as a nominee. It was adapted from the play of the same name by Georg Büchner.

Cast
 Lajos Kovács as Woyzeck
 Diana Vacaru as Mari
 Éva Igó as Mari (voice)
 Aleksandr Porokhovshchikov as Kapitány
 Gábor Reviczky as Kapitány (voice)
 Péter Haumann as Orvos
 Sándor Gáspár as Policeman
 Sándor Varga as Fiú

See also
 List of submissions to the 67th Academy Awards for Best Foreign Language Film
 List of Hungarian submissions for the Academy Award for Best Foreign Language Film

References

External links
 

1994 films
1994 drama films
Hungarian drama films
Hungarian black-and-white films
1990s Hungarian-language films
Films directed by János Szász
Hungarian films based on plays
European Film Awards winners (films)
Works based on Woyzeck